James Robert Forrest Jr. (January 24, 1920 – August 26, 1980) was an American jazz musician, who played tenor saxophone throughout his career.

Forrest is known for his first solo recording of "Night Train". It reached No. 1 on the Billboard R&B chart in March 1952, and stayed at the top for seven weeks. "Hey Mrs. Jones" (No. 3 R&B) and "Bolo Blues" were his other hits. All were made for United Records, for which he recorded between 1951 and 1953; he recorded frequently as both a sideman and a bandleader.

Biography
Born in St. Louis, Missouri, United States, Forrest played alongside Fate Marable as a young man.  He was with Jay McShann in 1940-42 and with Andy Kirk from 1942 until 1948 when he joined Duke Ellington.  During the early 1950s, Forrest led his own combos.  He also played with Miles Davis, in early 1952 at The Barrel Club.  After his solo career, he played in small combos with Harry "Sweets" Edison and Al Grey, as well as appearing with Count Basie.

Late in life Forrest married Betty Tardy (November 30, 1929 – October 21, 2011), and settled in Grand Rapids, Michigan, where he died in August 1980, aged 60, from heart failure.

Other media
Forrest performs an extended version of "Night Train" with the Basie Orchestra in the 1979 film The Last of the Blue Devils.

Forrest's version of "Night Train" was the theme song of a nightly rhythm and blues radio program in the Houston, Texas area. Also called Night Train, the program was hosted by William A. "Rascal" McCaskill, and was broadcast on KREL-AM between 1954 and 1957.

During the late 1970s, Forrest appeared with an all-star line-up in New York, including Howard McGhee on trumpet, John Hicks on piano, Major Holley on bass, and Charlie Persip on drums.

In his 2000 book, The Devil and Sonny Liston, author Nick Tosches notes that Forrest's music was a favorite of heavyweight boxer Sonny Liston, also from St. Louis, who would listen to "Night Train" and other Forrest music during training sessions and before fights.

Discography

As leader
 1951: Night Train (United ULP-002 [rel. 1955]; reissue: Delmark DL-435 [rel. 1978])
 1959: All the Gin Is Gone (Delmark DL-404 [rel. 1964]) – with Harold Mabern, Grant Green
 1959: Black Forrest (Delmark DL-427 [rel. 1972]) – with Harold Mabern, Grant Green
 1960: Forrest Fire (New Jazz NJLP-8250) – with Larry Young
 1961: Out of the Forrest (Prestige PRLP-7202)
 1961: Sit Down and Relax with Jimmy Forrest (Prestige PRLP-7235 [rel. 1962])
 1961: Most Much! (Prestige PRLP-7218)
 1962: Soul Street (New Jazz NJLP-8293 [rel. 1964])
 1969: The Best of Jimmy Forrest (Prestige	PR-7712) – compilation of tracks from Prestige 7202, 7218, 7223, 7235, and New Jazz 8293.
 1978: Live at Rick's (Aviva AV-6002 [rel. 1979]) – with Al Grey, Shirley Scott
 1978: Truly Wonderful (Stash STCD-552 [rel. 1992]) – with Al Grey, Shirley Scott
 1978: Night Train Revisited (Storyville STCD-8293 [rel. 1999]) – with Al Grey, Shirley Scott
 1978: Heart of the Forrest (Palo Alto PA-8021 [rel. 1982]; reissue: Muse MCD-5509, 1995) – with Shirley Scott
 1980: O.D. (Out 'Dere) (Grey Forrest GF-1001) – with Al Grey, Don Patterson

As sideman
With Cat Anderson
 Cat on a Hot Tin Horn (Mercury, 1958)
With Count Basie
 In Europe (LRC, 1974)
 Fun Time (Pablo, 1975)
 Basie Big Band (Pablo, 1975)
 I Told You So (Pablo, 1976)
 Prime Time (Pablo, 1977)
 Montreux '77 (Pablo, 1977)

With Miles Davis
 Live at The Barrel (Prestige P-7858, 1952 [rel. 1983]; reissued on CD as Prestige PCD-24117 [rel. 1992] with a new title: Our Delight: Recorded Live At The Barrel, St. Louis)
 Live at The Barrel, Volume Two (Prestige P-7860, 1952 [rel. 1984]; reissued on CD as Prestige PCD-24117 [rel. 1992] with a new title: Our Delight: Recorded Live At The Barrel, St. Louis)
With Harry "Sweets" Edison

 The Swinger (Verve, 1958)
 Mr. Swing (Verve, 1958 [rel. 1960])
 Harry Edison Swings Buck Clayton (Verve, 1958) – with Buck Clayton
 Sweetenings (Roulette, 1958)
 Patented by Edison (Roulette, 1960)

With Bennie Green
 Swings the Blues (Enrica, 1959)
 Bennie Green (Time, 1960)
 Hornful of Soul aka Cat Walk (Bethlehem, 1960)
With Grant Green
 First Recordings CD Reissue - All the Gin is Gone / Black Forrest
  
With Al Grey
 Grey's Mood (Disques Black And Blue 33.085, 1973–1975; reissue: Classic Jazz CJ-118 [rel. 1979]; reissued on CD as Black & Blue BB-912 [rel. 2000])
 Struttin' and Shoutin' (Columbia FC-38505, 1976 [rel. 1983])
 Travelers Lounge Live (Travelers TRV-3001, 1977)
 Al Grey featuring Arnett Cobb (Disques Black And Blue 33.143, 1977; reissued on CD as Black & Blue BB-954 [rel. 2002] with a new title: Ain't That Funk For You)

With Jo Jones
Vamp 'til Ready (Everest, 1960)

With Jack McDuff
 Tough 'Duff (Prestige, 1960)
 The Honeydripper (Prestige, 1961)

With Blue Mitchell
 Blue Mitchell (Mainstream, 1971)

With Oliver Nelson
 Soul Battle (Prestige PRLP-7223, 1960 [rel. 1962]) – with King Curtis

With Waymon Reed
 46th and 8th (Artists House, 1977 [1979])

With Betty Roché
 Singin' & Swingin' (Prestige, 1960) – with Jack McDuffWith Joe Williams' Together (Roulette, 1961) – with Harry "Sweets" Edison
 Joe Williams Live! A Swingin' Night at Birdland'' (Roulette, 1962)

References

External links
[ Allmusic biography]

1920 births
1980 deaths
Musicians from St. Louis
American jazz tenor saxophonists
American male saxophonists
Jump blues musicians
Duke Ellington Orchestra members
Count Basie Orchestra members
Palo Alto Records artists
Prestige Records artists
Muse Records artists
Delmark Records artists
United Records artists
20th-century American musicians
20th-century saxophonists
American male jazz musicians
Jeter-Pillars Orchestra members
20th-century American male musicians